Nova srpska politička misao is a  Belgrade-based publisher and quarterly magazine dealing with politics and policy studies.

History and profile
Founded in 1994 under the name Srpska politička misao, the magazine has typically attracted young, independent political scientists, philosophers, sociologists, psychologists, and economists who discuss topical, and sometimes controversial, political questions. Two years later, its publisher (the state-controlled Institute of Political Studies) dismissed the editorial board and all but banned the magazine. But soon after, Vreme, a Belgrade-based independent weekly, took it over, rehired the original editorial board, and relaunched it with "New" tacked on the title.

Editorial stance 
Its editorial orientation has been described as conservative, nationalist, radical right, far-right, Eurosceptic, and pro-Russian.

References

External links
 

Magazines established in 1994
Mass media in Belgrade
Quarterly magazines
Political magazines published in Serbia
Serbian-language magazines